The Anterior Taunus ( or Vortaunus) is a natural region within the Hessian Central Upland range of the Taunus (major unit group 30) in Germany that lies south of the High Taunus (301). The region lies below the main ridge of the Taunus.

Literature 
 Reimer Herrmann: Vergleichende Hydrogeographie des Taunus und seiner südlichen und südöstlichen Randgebiete. Wilhelm Schmitz Verlag, Gießen, 1965, .
 Eugen Ernst: Naturpark Hochtaunus. (HB Naturmagazin draußen). Hamburg, 1983.
 Ingrid Berg, Eugen Ernst, Hans-Joachim Galuschka, Gerta Walsh: Heimat Hochtaunus. Frankfurt am Main, 1988, .
 Alexander Stahr, Birgit Bender: Der Taunus – Eine Zeitreise. Borntraeger-Verlag, Stuttgart, 2007, .
 Eugen Ernst: Der Taunus – Ein L(i)ebenswertes Mittelgebirge. Frankfurt, 2009, .

External links 

 Map services, Bundesamt für Naturschutz
 Umweltatlas Hessen: Description of the natural regions of the Taunus

Taunus
Frankfurt